Dobb-e Hardan (also Romanized as Dobb-e Ḩardān; also known as Daub al Hirdān, Dobb-e-Harvān, Doobé Hardan, Dowb-e Jerdān, Dūb Alḩerdān, Dūbb-e Ḩerdan, Dūbb-e Jerdān, Dūb-e Ḩardān, Dūb-e Ḩerdān, and Dūb-e Ḩervān) is a village in Esmailiyeh Rural District, in the Central District of Ahvaz County, Khuzestan Province, Iran. At the 2006 census, its population was 1,060, in 230 families.

References 

Populated places in Ahvaz County